Open My Eyes may refer to:

"Open My Eyes", a demo version of "Open Your Eyes" from Calling Time 
"Open My Eyes", a song by Nazz
"Open My Eyes", a song by Tiffany from The Color of Silence
"Open My Eyes", a song by Ale Q & Avedon featuring Jonathan Mendelsohn, edit by Tom Swoon